The Benadryl challenge is an internet challenge that emerged in 2020, revolving around the deliberate consumption, excessive use and overdose of the antihistamine medicine diphenhydramine (commonly sold in the United States under the brand name Benadryl), which acts as a deliriant in high doses. The challenge, which spread via the social media platform TikTok, instructs participants to film themselves consuming large doses of Benadryl and documenting the effect of tripping or hallucinating.

Numerous authorities have advised against the challenge, as deliberate overconsumption of diphenhydramine can lead to adverse effects, including confusion, delirium, psychosis, organ damage, hyperthermia, convulsions, coma, and death. On September 24, 2020, the FDA formally released a statement advising parents and medical practitioners to be aware of the challenge's prevalence and its risks.

The recreational use of diphenhydramine and addiction is well-reported in medical literature, and overdoses are treatable with correct intervention. Its psychoactive effects at high dosages, which are a symptom of anticholinergic poisoning, are also well documented. In severe cases, the overdose of diphenhydramine and other anticholinergic medicines can lead to a phenomenon referred to as an anticholinergic toxidrome, which can affect organ systems throughout the body, including the nervous system and cardiovascular system.

Several participants have been hospitalized as a result of the challenge, including three teenagers admitted to the Cook Children's Medical Center after consuming at least 14 diphenhydramine tablets, and a 15-year-old Oklahoman teen who died from an overdose after attempting to take part.

See also
 Consumption of Tide Pods
 Milk crate challenge, a 2021 challenge which encouraged participants to take part in a dangerous activity that risked inflicting severe injury.
 Blackout challenge

Notes

References

Internet memes introduced in 2020
Substance-related disorders
2020s fads and trends
Eating behaviors of humans
TikTok